Katakuti is a 2022 Indian Bengali language crime and thriller web series directed by Raja Chanda and written by Arnab Bhaumik.

The web series is produced under Raja Chanda Films, Angel Digital and Ediview.

Sourav Das, Manasi Sengupta, Devtanu, Paean Sarkar, Abhijit Guha and Sirsha Rakshit are in the mail role in the web series.

Cast
Sourav Das
Manasi Sengupta
Paean Sarkar
Devtanu
Abhijit Guha
Sirsha Rakshit
Biplab Bandopadhyay
Buddhadeb Bhattacharya
Rajdip Ghosh

Synopsis
Aditya, a shy young man, and Kaushani are set to get married when a tragic catastrophe prevents it. Aditya, who is devastated, must accept the loss of his sweetheart. Kousani was slain after being gang-raped. He learns about the three criminals responsible for the heinous crime, which leaves him devastated. One of them was a close family friend of Kousani's. Aditya, a typically reserved youngster, undergoes a drastic transformation and sets out to exact cruel retribution on Kousani and her family.

Reception 
Katakuti received mixed to positive reviews from critics. IMDB gave this series 8.1 ratings. Binged rated 8.8.

Episodes

References

2022 films
Bengali-language web series
Indian thriller films